Francis Dubois (born 28 November 1961) is a French politician from The Republicans. He has been Member of Parliament for Corrèze's 1st constituency since 2022.

References 

Living people
1961 births
Deputies of the 16th National Assembly of the French Fifth Republic
21st-century French politicians
The Republicans (France) politicians
Members of Parliament for Corrèze